Sergey Lagodinsky (born 1 December 1975) is a German lawyer and politician of the Alliance 90/The Greens who has been serving as a Member of the European Parliament since 2019.

Early life and education
Lagodinksy grew up in Astrakhan. In 1993, his family emigrated from Russia and settled in Schleswig-Holstein.

Lagodinsky holds a law degree from the University of Göttingen and a master's degree in public administration from Harvard University's John F. Kennedy School of Government. He received a PhD in law from the Humboldt University of Berlin. His PhD research focused on issues of human rights, anti-discrimination and freedom of speech. He completed the second state examination in law (bar exam) in Berlin. For his studies, he received scholarships from the German National Academic Foundation and the Heinrich Böll Foundation.

Early career
From 2003 to 2008, Lagodinsky served as program director, and later as an advisor to the managing director, at the Berlin office of the American Jewish Committee (AJC). In 2008 and 2009 he was a Fellow at the Stiftung Neue Verantwortung in Berlin and in 2010 he was a Yale World Fellow in New Haven.

From 2011 until 2012, Lagodinsky was an attorney with the Berlin office of international law firm Orrick, Herrington & Sutcliffe. He subsequently headed the EU/North America department of the Heinrich Böll Foundation in Berlin. In addition, he was a non-resident fellow with the Global Public Policy Institute (GPPi) in Berlin.

Political career
From 2001, Lagodinsky was a member of the Social Democratic Party (SPD). During that time, he was (alongside Peter Feldmann) a co-founder and speaker of the party's Jewish Caucus (AJS), a position he held from 2007 until 2011. Amid the controversy over Thilo Sarrazin, he left the party and instead joined Alliance 90/The Greens in 2011.

Lagodinsky has been a Member of the European Parliament since the 2019 European elections. He has since been serving on the Committee on Legal Affairs. In this capacity, he is also a member of the Democracy, Rule of Law & Fundamental Rights Monitoring Group.

In addition to his committee assignments, Lagodinsky is part of the Parliament's delegations to the EU-Turkey Joint Parliamentary Committee and to the Euronest Parliamentary Assembly. He is also a member of the European Parliament Intergroup on Anti-Racism and Diversity.

In the negotiations to form a so-called traffic light coalition of the Social Democratic Party (SPD), the Green Party and the Free Democratic Party (FDP) following the 2021 German elections, Lagodinsky was part of his party's delegation in the working group on homeland security, civil rights and consumer protection, co-chaired by Christine Lambrecht, Konstantin von Notz and Wolfgang Kubicki.

Other activities
 European Council on Foreign Relations (ECFR), Member (since 2020)
 Amadeu Antonio Foundation, Member of the Council
 Ernst Ludwig Ehrlich Scholarship Fund, Member of the Advisory Board
 Humanity in Action Germany, Member of the Advisory Board

References

External links

20th-century German Jews
21st-century German Jews
Living people
MEPs for Germany 2019–2024
Alliance 90/The Greens MEPs
University of Göttingen alumni
Humboldt University of Berlin alumni
Harvard Kennedy School alumni
1975 births
Orrick, Herrington & Sutcliffe people
German people of Russian-Jewish descent